Knut Olof Mark (January 13, 1873 – May 15, 1920) was a Swedish sailor who competed in the 1912 Summer Olympics. In 1912 he was part of the Swedish boat Sass which finished fourth in the 6 metre class competition.

References

1873 births
1920 deaths
Swedish male sailors (sport)
Olympic sailors of Sweden
Sailors at the 1912 Summer Olympics – 6 Metre